Charles "Woody" Burton (born June 11, 1945) is an American politician. He was a member of the Indiana House of Representatives from the 58th District from 1988 through 2020. He is a member of the Republican party. Burton served on the Johnson County Council from 1980 to 1984. His brother is former Congressman Dan Burton.

References

Living people
Republican Party members of the Indiana House of Representatives
21st-century American politicians
1945 births
Politicians from Indianapolis